Rameshwar Singh Yadav is an Indian politician and a member of the Sixteenth Legislative Assembly of Uttar Pradesh in India. He represents the Aliganj constituency of Uttar Pradesh and is a member of the Samajwadi Party political party.

Early life and  education
Rameshwar Singh Yadav was born in Etah district. He attended the  Janta Inter College and is educated till tenth grade.

Political career
Rameshwar Singh Yadav has been an
MLA for three terms. He represented the Aliganj constituency and is a member of the Samajwadi Party political party.

He lost his seat in the 2017 Uttar Pradesh Assembly election to Satyapal Singh Rauthar of the Bharatiya Janata Party.

Posts held

See also

 Aliganj (Assembly constituency)
 Sixteenth Legislative Assembly of Uttar Pradesh
 Uttar Pradesh Legislative Assembly

References 

Samajwadi Party politicians
Uttar Pradesh MLAs 1997–2002
Uttar Pradesh MLAs 2002–2007
Uttar Pradesh MLAs 2012–2017
People from Etah district
1953 births
Living people